Arthur George Watson (born 11 October 1940) is a former Australian cricket umpire. He stood in three ODI games between 1979 and 1980.

See also
 List of One Day International cricket umpires

References

1940 births
Living people
Australian One Day International cricket umpires